Mickaël Ziard Alain Gaffoor (born 21 January 1987) is a French professional footballer who plays for Spanish club Águilas FC as a centre-back.

Club career
Born in Bezons, Île-de-France, Gaffoor spent the vast majority of his professional career in Spain, starting out at Sangonera Atlético CF in 2007. In the country's Segunda División, he played a total of 150 matches in representation of CD Guadalajara, CD Numancia, CD Mirandés and Albacete Balompié (ten goals scored).

On 25 June 2018, Cypriot First Division club AC Omonia announced the signing of Gaffoor. The 32-year-old free agent returned to the Spanish Segunda División B one year later, joining FC Andorra in an undisclosed deal.

References

External links

1987 births
Living people
People from Bezons
French footballers
Footballers from Val-d'Oise
Association football defenders
Championnat National 2 players
Rodez AF players
Segunda División players
Segunda División B players
Tercera División players
Segunda Federación players
Real Zaragoza B players
Celta de Vigo B players
CD Guadalajara (Spain) footballers
CD Numancia players
CD Mirandés footballers
Albacete Balompié players
FC Andorra players
Águilas FC players
Cypriot First Division players
AC Omonia players
French expatriate footballers
Expatriate footballers in Spain
Expatriate footballers in Cyprus
Expatriate footballers in Andorra
French expatriate sportspeople in Spain
French expatriate sportspeople in Cyprus
French expatriate sportspeople in Andorra